Belleville is a city and the county seat of St. Clair County, Illinois, coterminous with the now defunct Belleville Township. It is located within Greater St. Louis and is the seventh-largest municipality in the 15-county metropolitan area. It is also the seat of the Roman Catholic Diocese of Belleville and the National Shrine of Our Lady of the Snows. The population was 44,478 according to the Census Bureau's 2010 data, making it the largest city in the state south of Springfield.

Belleville is a major southeastern suburb of St. Louis, Missouri. Belleville is the eighth-most populated city in the state outside the Chicago metropolitan area, and the most-populated city in southern Illinois and in the Metro-East region of the St. Louis Metropolitan Area. Due to its proximity to Scott Air Force Base, the population receives a boost from military and federal civilian personnel, defense contractors, and military retirees.

History

George Blair named the city of Belleville in 1814. Because Blair donated an acre of his land for the town square and an additional  adjoining the square for the new county seat, the legislature transferred the county seat from the village of Cahokia.  The latter had been established by French colonists as a mission village in the late 17th century.

Belleville was incorporated as a village in 1819, and became a city in 1850. It is said that Blair originally named the city Bellville in honor of Tennessee politician John Bell. In 1863, the name was officially changed to Belleville to distance the city from the now-disgraced Confederate. Major immigration in the mid-19th century to this area occurred following revolutions in Germany, and most of the European-American population is of German ancestry.

Many of the educated Germans fled their homeland after the failure of the German Revolution in 1848. Belleville was the center of the first important German settlement in Illinois. By 1870, an estimated 90% of the city's population was either German-born or of German descent.

After the Civil War, Belleville became a manufacturing center producing nails, printing presses, gray iron castings, agricultural equipment, and stoves. Belleville became known as "The Stove Capital of the World." The first brewery in Illinois was established in Belleville. In 1868, Gustav Goelitz founded the candy company that is known today as "Jelly Belly."

An immense deposit of bituminous coal was found in St. Clair County. By 1874, some farmers had become coal miners.  One hundred shaft mines were in operation in and around Belleville.  The coal brought the steam railroad to town, which allowed for the transport of many tons of coal to be shipped daily from Belleville to St. Louis on the west side of the Mississippi River, for use in its industries, homes and businesses.  Later, Belleville had the first electric trolley in the state.

The first style of houses in Belleville were simple brick cottages, known locally as "German street houses" or "row houses."  Architectural styles flourished in greater variety, featuring American Foursquare, French Second Empire, Greek Revival, Gothic Revival, Italianate, Queen Anne, and Victorian. The Belleville Historic District, which was listed on the National Register of Historic Places in 1976, comprises 73 contributing properties.

The "Old Belleville Historic District," was defined and recognized in 1974 and is the city's first historic district. The city also has designated two more historic districts:  "Hexenbuckel" (est. in 1991) and "Oakland" (est. in 1995).

Belleville's early German immigrants were educated, with most of them having graduated from German universities. They were nicknamed "Latin Farmers" because of this. After 1836 Gustav Koerner contributed to establish the city's public library.  The Belleville Public Library is the state's oldest, predating the Illinois State Library by three years. The German settlers also founded choral and dramatic groups, as well as literary societies. They established one of the first kindergartens in the country here.

The National Civic League recognized Belleville in 2011 as one of the ten recipients of the All-America City Award.

In 2021, residents of the Illinois city elected Patty Gregory as Belleville's first female Mayor.

Geography 
Belleville is located at  (38.521567, −89.995208).

Richland Creek flows through much of Belleville.

Climate

Culture and contemporary life

Bethany Place in Belleville provides services for those with HIV/AIDS.

Entertainment and performing arts
The Belleville Philharmonic Society was formed in 1866, making it the second oldest philharmonic orchestra in the country. With the increase in black population and migrants from the South, musicians developed who played blues and jazz; later rock clubs were added to the scene.

Jay Farrar (now of Son Volt), Mike Heidorn, and Jeff Tweedy (now of Wilco) of the now-defunct alt country group Uncle Tupelo are from Belleville. Another major musician was Neal Doughty, keyboardist for 1970s rock band REO Speedwagon. The rock band Redding also hails from Belleville, with the members being childhood friends there. They then went on to work from the entertainment and shopping company Vat19.

National Register of Historic Places
 Belleville Historic District
 Gustave Koerner House
 Knobeloch-Seibert Farm

Sports
 Rowdies Rugby Football Club – the only rugby football club in the Belleville area.
 Lindenwood Stadium is a college football stadium with alternating red and gray stripes.  It has been called "The nation's most original (hideous) football field."
 Belleville was home to the Belleville Stags (1947–1949), who were a minor league baseball team. The Stags were charter members of the Illinois State League and remained when the league changed names to the Mississippi–Ohio Valley League in 1949, eventually becoming today's Midwest League in 1956. The Stags played at the Belleville Athletic Field and were named and supported by their namesake, Stag Beer. The Stags were an affiliate of the New York Yankees (1949) and St. Louis Browns (1947–1948).

Demographics

At the 2000 census there were 41,410 people, 17,603 households, and 10,420 families living in the city. The racial makeup of the city was 81.51% White, 15.51% African American, 0.26% Native American, 0.81% Asian, 0.07% Pacific Islander, 0.41% from other races, and 1.43% from two or more races. Hispanic or Latino of any race were 1.63%.

Of the 17,603 households 28.4% had children under the age of 18 living with them, 42.0% were married couples living together, 13.5% had a female householder with no husband present, and 40.8% were non-families. 35.1% of households were one person and 14.0% were one person aged 65 or older. The average household size was 2.27 and the average family size was 2.95.

The age distribution was 23.4% under the age of 18, 9.0% from 18 to 24, 30.3% from 25 to 44, 20.1% from 45 to 64, and 17.2% 65 or older. The median age was 37 years. For every 100 females, there were 88.9 males. For every 100 females age 18 and over, there were 85.0 males.

The median household income was $35,979 and the median family income  was $46,426. Males had a median income of $33,361 versus $25,375 for females. The per capita income for the city was $18,990. About 9.3% of families and 11.7% of the population were below the poverty line, including 16.2% of those under age 18 and 9.3% of those age 65 or over.

2010 Census 
As of the 2010 Census, there were 44,478 people, 18,795 households, 11,081 families living in the city. The population density was. The racial makeup of the city was 69.8% White, 25.4% African American, 0.3% Native American, 1.0% Asian, 0.1% Pacific Islander, 0.6% from other races, and 2.8% from two or more races. Hispanic or Latino of any race were 2.6% of the population

Of the 18,795 households 27.7% had children under the age of 18 living with them, 38% were married couples living together, 16.4 had a female householder with no man present, and 41% were non-families. 34.4% of households were one person and 10.8% had someone living alone who was 65 years of age of older. The average household size was 2.3 and the average family size was 2.9.

The age distribution was 23.3% under the age of 18, and 12.9% over the age of 65.

Notable people

 Black Beaver (1806–1880), Delaware Native American leader, scout, and rancher
 Charles Romyn Dake, 19th-century American homeopathic physician and writer
 Lea DeLaria, American comedian, actress, and jazz singer
 Buddy Ebsen, American actor and dancer
 Jay Farrar, American songwriter and musician
 Mary Lynne Gasaway Hill, poet, writer, professor at St. Mary's University, Texas and Fellow of the Royal Society of Arts
 Bob Goalby, Professional golfer, winner of the 1968 Masters Tournament
 Sandra Magnus, American engineer and a former NASA astronaut
 Darius Miles, former American professional basketball player
 Edward P. Petri, Illinois state representative, sheriff, and businessman
 Mary Ellen Richmond, constructed the foundations for the scientific methodology development of professional social work and is considered as the mother of social casework.
 Jeff Tweedy, musician, songwriter, author, and record producer 
 Kevin Von Erich, an American retired professional wrestler
 Stephen R. Wigginton, U.S. Attorney for the Southern District of Illinois from 2010 to 2015.

Education
Higher education: 
 The Saint Louis University Family Medicine Residency
 Lindenwood University – Belleville 
 Southwestern Illinois College

Within the city there are four high schools – two public (Belleville High School-East, Belleville High School-West), and two private (Althoff Catholic High School, Governor French Academy). In addition, small portions of the city are within the districts for East St. Louis Senior High School, Mascoutah High School, and Freeburg High School.

Belleville is also home to a relatively large grade school district. Belleville District 118 has 9 elementary schools, (Roosevelt, Abraham Lincoln, Douglas, Franklin, Jefferson, Union, Westhaven, Henry Raab, and Washington) and 2 junior high schools (Central Junior High and West Junior High). Belle Valley School District 119 is also available for public school. Harmony School District 175 includes Ellis Elementary and Emge Jr. High. Signal Hill School is the only school in district 181. Whiteside Elementary School and Whiteside Middle School make up district 115. Parochial grade schools include St. Peter's Cathedral, St. Augustine of Canterbury Church, St. Teresa, Blessed Sacrament, Our Lady Queen of Peace, and Zion Lutheran School.

Media
The Belleville News-Democrat, is the city's daily newspaper. The News-Democrat is part of the McClatchy chain and covers the Metro East region and Southwestern Illinois. The city is also served by the St. Louis Post-Dispatch, the area's major metropolitan daily. Belleville receives the signals of most radio and TV stations based in St. Louis.

Transportation
Belleville has three St. Louis MetroLink stations connecting it to St. Louis and the network via light rail: Memorial Hospital, Belleville, and College.

Illinois State Highways 15, 159, 177, 13 and 161 all pass through Belleville. Belleville is also adjacent to Interstate highways 64 and 255. I-64 is an east–west highway extending from Wentzville, Missouri to Virginia Beach, Virginia and is the major route from Belleville to downtown St. Louis.  I-255 is part of a system of expressways that together form a loop around St. Louis.

Belleville has a bicycle trail that runs through the city from Southside Park to Southwestern Illinois College and Scott Air Force Base; it is mainly used for recreational purposes.

Belleville's area airports are Scott Air Force Base and MidAmerica St. Louis Airport, which is served by Allegiant Air. The nearest major airport with regularly scheduled commercial passenger service is St. Louis Lambert International Airport.

Sister city
Belleville is a sister city to Paderborn, Germany.

References

External links

The Belleville Historical Society

 
Cities in Illinois
County seats in Illinois
German-American history
Populated places established in 1814
Cities in St. Clair County, Illinois
1814 establishments in Illinois Territory